Karolis Uzėla (born 11 March 2000) is a Lithuanian football player. He plays for Latvian club RFS.

Club career
He spent the 2018–19 season on loan at Italian club SPAL, where he mostly played for their Under-19 squad. He was called up to the senior team for Serie A games on two occasions, but remained on the bench in both games.

On 25 January 2022, he signed a three-year contract with RFS in Latvia.

International career
He made his debut for the Lithuania national football team on 2 September 2021 in a World Cup qualifier against Northern Ireland, a 1–4 home loss. He substituted Ovidijus Verbickas in the 80th minute.

References

External links
 
 

2000 births
Living people
Lithuanian footballers
Lithuania youth international footballers
Lithuania under-21 international footballers
Lithuania international footballers
Association football midfielders
FK Žalgiris players
S.P.A.L. players
FK RFS players
A Lyga players
Lithuanian expatriate footballers
Expatriate footballers in Italy
Lithuanian expatriate sportspeople in Italy
Expatriate footballers in Latvia
Lithuanian expatriate sportspeople in Latvia